Killala Bay is a bay on the west coast of Ireland between County Mayo and County Sligo. It is situated between Kilcummin Head to the west and Lenadoon Point to the east. and is the estuary for the River Moy.  The village of Killala is situated at the southwest corner of the bay.

Geography

The bay is on the west coast of Ireland between County Mayo and County Sligo. It is situated between Kilcummin Head to the west and Lenadoon Point to the east. and is the estuary for the River Moy.  The village of Killala is situated at the southwest corner of the bay.  Bartragh Island is situated in the center of the bay.

Water
The bay is an extension of the estuary of the River Moy, with deep waters of the continental shelf close to the shore.

The middle of the bay is safe for boats but caution needs to be exercised near the shoreline.

Shore
Kilcummin Head, also known as Benwee Head, is regarded as the start of Killala Bay.  As such excludes Lackan Bay and Creevagh Head which lie to the northwest.  To the south of the head lies the village of Kilcummin.  Counter-clockwise round the bay there is Killala, River Moy, Enniscrone,  Pollacheeny Harbour, before Lenadoon Point.

Activities
Killala Bay is an excellent fishing location due to the close proximity of the deep waters of the continental shelf, having both deep water rock marks, beach marks, and opportunities to catch deep water species from charter boats.  Cockles can be found in the bay due to its sheltered nature.

Ross Strand on the bay near Killala village is a Blue Flag beach.

References

Notes

Footnotes

Sources

 
 
 </ref>
 
 
 </ref>

Bays of County Mayo
Ramsar sites in the Republic of Ireland